40,000 (forty thousand) is the natural number that comes after 39,999 and before 40,001. It is the square of 200.

Selected numbers in the range 40001–49999

40001 to 40999
 40320 = smallest factorial (8!) that is not a highly composite number
 40425 = square pyramidal number
 40585 = largest factorion
 40678 = pentagonal pyramidal number
 40804 = palindromic square

41000 to 41999
 41041 = Carmichael number
 41472 = 3-smooth number
 41586 = Large Schröder number
 41616 = triangular square number
 41835 = Motzkin number
 41841 = 1/41841 = 0.0000239 is a repeating decimal with period 7.

42000 to 42999
 42680 = octahedral number
 42875 = 353
 42925 = square pyramidal number

43000 to 43999
 43261 = Markov number
 43390 = number of primes .
 43560 = pentagonal pyramidal number
 43691 = Wagstaff prime
 43777 = smallest member of a prime sextuplet

44000 to 44999
 44044 = palindrome of 79 after 6 iterations of the "reverse and add" iterative process
 44100 = sum of the cubes of the first 20 positive integers. 44,100 Hz is a common sampling frequency in digital audio (and is the standard for compact discs).
 44444 = repdigit
 44721 = smallest positive integer such that the expression  −  ≤ 10−9
 44944 = palindromic square

45000 to 45999

 45360 = highly composite number; first number to have 100 factors (including one and itself)

46000 to 46999
 46233 = sum of the first eight factorials
 46368 = Fibonacci number
 46656 = 36, 66, 3-smooth number
 46657 = Carmichael number
 46664 = Nelson Mandela's prisoner number

47000 to 47999
 47058 = primary pseudoperfect number
 47160 = 10-th derivative of xx at x=1
 47321/33461 ≈ √2

48000 to 48999

49000 to 49999
 49151 = Woodall number
 49152 = 3-smooth number
 49726 = pentagonal pyramidal number

References

40000